The Forest Products Association of Canada (FPAC) is a trade association which represents Canada's wood, pulp and paper producers both nationally and internationally in government, trade, and environmental affairs. Canada's forest products industry is an $80 billion a year industry that represents 2% of Canada's GDP.

History 

Founded in 1913, the Canadian Pulp and Paper Association changed its name to the Forest Products Association of Canada in February 2001.

In May 2010, under the leadership of then President Avrim Lazar, FPAC successfully helped to negotiate The Canadian Boreal Forest Agreement, with several large ENGOs. The first independent audit of the CBFA in 2011 revealed a lack of progress in achieving formal milestones and in 2017 the long-term survival of the agreement was put into question.

Description 

Third-party certification of member companies' forest practices is a condition of membership in the Association. FPAC member companies are: AbitibiBowater, Alberta-Pacific Forest Industries Inc. (Al-Pac), Canfor, Canfor Pulp Limited Partnership, Cariboo Pulp and Paper Company, Cascades Inc., Catalyst Paper Corporation, FF Soucy, Howe Sound Pulp and Paper Mill, NewPage Corporation, Kruger Inc., Louisiana-Pacific Canada Ltd., Mercer, Mill & Timber Products Ltd., Papier Masson, SFK Pulp, Tembec Enterprises Inc. Tolko Industries Ltd., UPM-Kymmene Miramichi Inc., West Fraser Timber Co. Ltd., Weyerhaeuser Company Limited.

See also
 Great Bear Rainforest

References

External links
 Forest Products Association of Canada, organization website
 The Canadian Boreal Forest Agreement

Forest products companies of Canada
Trade associations based in Canada
Pulp and paper industry in Canada